Alpiglen is a request stop railway station in the municipality of Grindelwald in the Swiss canton of Bern. The station is served by the Wengernalpbahn (WAB), whose trains operate from Grindelwald to Kleine Scheidegg. It takes its name from the nearby settlement of Alpiglen.

The station is served by the following passenger trains:

Gallery

References

External links 
 

Railway stations in the canton of Bern
Grindelwald